is a Japanese professional footballer who plays as a midfielder or defender for Nankatsu SC. He played for Japan national team.

He regular plays as either a defensive midfielder or a centre back. He has previously played for Consadole Sapporo, FC Tokyo and Gamba Osaka.

Club career
After graduating from Tohoku High School, Konno signed his first professional contract with J1 League side Consadole Sapporo ahead of the 2001 season. He spent three seasons in total in Consadole and made 65 league appearances for the men in red and black who were relegated to J2 League for the 2003 season. He spent one year playing J2 before heading south to join FC Tokyo in 2004. He played more than 250 league games across eight seasons at the Ajinomoto Stadium and helped them lift the J.League Cup in 2004 and 2009 as well as J2 League and the Emperor's Cup in his final season at the club in 2011.

He moved west to join Gamba Osaka in 2012. His first season with the men in blue and black was not a happy one as they were relegated down to Japan's second division following a 17th-place finish in the league. They bounced back as champions at the first time of asking with Konno netting four times in 32 games. 2014 got even better for Gamba as they marked their return to Japan's top flight by winning the domestic treble; lifting the J1 League trophy in addition to the J.League Cup and Emperor's Cup. Konno played 46 times and scored twice across all competitions, forming a central midfield partnership with Japan's most capped international player Yasuhito Endō.

Gamba retained their Emperor's Cup title in 2015 and added the 2015 Japanese Super Cup to their trophy cabinet, defeating Urawa Reds in the final of both competitions, they also reached the semi-finals of the AFC Champions League before going down to Chinese side Guangzhou Evergrande over two legs. Konno played 51 times in all competitions in 2015 and scored 6 goals.

Gamba did not win any silverware between 2016 and 2018, but Konno remained an important figure in the side, missing just one league game in 2016 as Gamba finished 3rd in the final standings. Injury forced him out for a spell in 2017 and he was able to make only 24 league appearances before an even longer spell on the sidelines caused him to miss the majority of the first half of the 2018 season. Gamba struggled under new head coach, the Brazilian Levir Culpi who was fired midway through the season and replaced by Gamba Osaka U-23 coach Tsuneyasu Miyamoto. Miyamoto's appointment coincided with Konno's return from injury and a Gamba side that had spent much of the season in the relegation zone went on a nine-match winning streak in the league and eventually ended up in a comfortable 9th place.

In July 2019, Konno moved to Júbilo Iwata.

International career
He was part of the Japan U23 national team at 2004 Olympics, which finished fourth in group B, below group winners Paraguay, Italy and Ghana. He also capped for Japan U20 team at the 2003 World Youth Championship.  

On 3 August 2005, he made his debut for the senior national team in an East Asian Cup match against China which finished in a 2–2 draw. He earned a second cap four days later, playing the full 90 minutes in a 1–0 win over South Korea. Later that year he came on as a second-half substitute in the 1–0 home victory over Iran in a 2006 World Cup qualifier.

Konno wouldn't play again for his country until after the 2006 World Cup Finals, playing in the 1–0 home friendly defeat to Ghana in October 2006 and the 2007 Asian Cup qualifying wins over India, later that month, and Saudi Arabia in November.

It would be another seven months before he next pulled on the blue of Japan, playing in the home friendly win over Montenegro and the draw with Colombia in June 2007. His performances in those games earned him a spot in Japan's squad for the 2007 Asian Cup and he played three times as they finished in 4th place following a 3–2 semi-final defeat to Saudi Arabia and a penalty shootout loss to South Korea in the 3rd / 4th place play off. He played three more non-competitive matches in 2007; against Qatar, Austria and Egypt.

In February 2008 he was selected in the squad for the East Asian Football Championship and played in the 1–0 win over China and the 1–1 draw with South Korea as Japan ended up in 2nd place in the final standings. 2008 turned out to be a busy year for him internationally as he played a further four friendly matches and 6 2010 World Cup qualifiers.

He played seven times in 2009, the first appearance coming as a second-half replacement in the 5–1 thrashing of Finland in February which was followed up by a start in the 4–0 win against Chile in May. He played twice the following month in the World Cup Qualifiers against Qatar and Australia. The matches did not turn out well for the Samurai Blue who could only draw 1–1 at home to Qatar before going down 2–1 away to Australia seven days later. Japan were back on form later in the year, defeating Scotland and Togo in October with Konno starting the first and coming on in the second half of the latter before also appearing as a substitute the following month in a 0–0 draw away to World Cup hosts South Africa.

The following year he was selected in Japan's squad for the 2010 World Cup in South Africa and was handed the number 15 jersey. He only got on the field for 2 minutes in the entire tournament, replacing Yoshito Ōkubo in the 88th minute of Japan's 3–1 Group E win over Denmark in Rustenburg which sealed their qualification to the last 16 where they'd go on to be eliminated by Paraguay on penalties.

2011 saw him named in the squad for the 2011 Asian Cup in Qatar where this time he wore the number 4 on his back. He played every minute of all Japan's six matches at the tournament as they went on to lift the title, defeating Australia 1–0 after extra time in the final thanks to Tadanari Lee's 109th-minute winner. Later in the year he scored his first international goal, a 36th-minute opener in the 4–0 win away to Tajikistan in a 2014 World Cup qualifier on 11 November.

He played eight international in 2012, a mixture of friendlies and World Cup qualifiers before being chosen in the Japan squad for the 2013 Confederations Cup in Brazil the following year. He started all three of the Samurai Blue's games at the tournament which all ended in defeat and saw them finish below Brazil, Italy and Mexico in the Group A standings.

In 2014 he played in his second World Cup, this time in Brazil. Japan were drawn in Group C along with Colombia, Greece and Ivory Coast and finished in 4th place with 1 draw and 2 defeats. Konno didn't play in the opening 2–1 defeat to the Ivory Coast, but started the 0–0 draw with Greece and the 4–1 defeat to Colombia.

He would play only a further ten matches for his country across three years after the 2014 World Cup, however he did manage to increase his international goal tally to four thanks to strikes in the 2–1 home friendly win over Australia in November 2014, the 2–0 away victory over the United Arab Emirates in a 2018 World Cup qualifier in March 2017 and finally in a 1–1 friendly draw at home to Syria on 7 June 2017. He played 93 games and scored four goals for Japan until 2017.

Career statistics

Club

International

Scores and results list Japan's goal tally first, score column indicates score after each Konno goal.

Honours
FC Tokyo
J2 League: 2011
Emperor's Cup: 2011
J.League Cup: 2004, 2009
Suruga Bank Championship: 2010

Gamba Osaka
J1 League: 2014
J2 League: 2013
Emperor's Cup: 2014, 2015
J.League Cup: 2014

Japan
AFC Asian Cup: 2011

References

External links

 
 
 

1983 births
Living people
Association football people from Miyagi Prefecture
Japanese footballers
Japan youth international footballers
Japan international footballers
J1 League players
J2 League players
J3 League players
Hokkaido Consadole Sapporo players
FC Tokyo players
Gamba Osaka players
Gamba Osaka U-23 players
Júbilo Iwata players
Nankatsu SC players
Footballers at the 2004 Summer Olympics
Olympic footballers of Japan
2007 AFC Asian Cup players
2010 FIFA World Cup players
2011 AFC Asian Cup players
AFC Asian Cup-winning players
2013 FIFA Confederations Cup players
2014 FIFA World Cup players
2015 AFC Asian Cup players
Association football midfielders